DC Rivals HyperCoaster is a steel hypercoaster at Warner Bros. Movie World on the Gold Coast, Queensland, Australia. Manufactured by Mack Rides, it is the longest, fastest, and tallest hypercoaster in the Southern Hemisphere. It officially opened on 22 September 2017, becoming the newest attraction added to Warner Bros. Movie World since Doomsday Destroyer in 2016 and the latest roller coaster addition since Green Lantern Coaster in 2011.

History 
In September 2016, crates from Mack Rides began to appear on groundwork that was ongoing in the park. In March 2017, construction blueprints were published about the roller coasters layout and station, and construction began in April. In late-May 2017, the park sent out email teasers to its guests indicating a new ride was going to be announced with varying quotes alongside a 3D rendered track. In the forthcoming weeks on 4 June 2017, the park formally announced the roller coaster as 'DC Rivals HyperCoaster' which was initially scheduled to be opened in October 2017 and would be themed to the DC Universe.

In July 2017, it was reported that the ride cost the park A$30 million to build. On 4 August 2017, the final piece of track was put into place, with testing beginning later on 19 August. On 11 September 2017, Warner Bros. Movie World launched advertisements for the ride, one in the form of an online website about the ride's statistics and another in the form of a television advertisement centred around characters from the DC Universe. Around this time, it was initially detailed by the Gold Coast Bulletin that the ride would be formally launched on 21 September 2017 during a VIP event. On 16 September 2017, the ride soft-opened to the public for technical rehearsals, and officially opened on 22 September 2017.

Shortly thereafter, in October 2017 Warner Bros. Movie World reported that the ride had made 6.9 million impressions through media coverage and 9.3 million impressions through social media. In addition, the opening day brought in 11,500 visitors to the park as a whole. During annual maintenance of the roller coaster in August 2018, the track was replaced on the camelback element to make the ride smoother.

Ride experience

Queue 
DC Rivals HyperCoaster has two main queues: a general admission queue for guests who do not own a pass and a Fast Track queue for those who have purchased to bypass queues for the major attractions at the park. Upon entering the station, riders—depending on their status—can choose from either four queues: general admission, backwards, Fast Track or single riders.

Layout 

After it is dispatched from the station, the train takes a right turn into the  lift hill. Upon reaching its maximum height, riders take a twist down the  85-degree-drop. Then, the train ascends the ride's tallest camel back hill before descending left to follow into the  non-inverting loop. Next, the train goes through a Stengel dive to the right before entering its left bank turning the train's direction back towards the station and then entering a series of twisted camel back hills. Following, the train enters a 480-degree-helix, then exits into a series of S-bend curves. Subsequently, the train rises and dips into two bunny hops before descending left towards a third bunny hill and into the final brake run leading riders back into the station after a right-hand turn.

Characteristics

Trains 
Each train has six cars with two rows of two seats. The last car has only one row with backwards facing seats. In total, each train seats 22 passengers. Each of the ride's two trains are themed to the Batmobile.

Reception 
DC Rivals HyperCoaster was acclaimed for its long, forceful layout and smooth ride experience. Finder.com.au Chris Stead cited the roller coaster as Warner Bros. Movie World's highlight attraction.

See also 
2017 in amusement parks

References 

Roller coasters introduced in 2017
Steel roller coasters
Roller coasters manufactured by Mack Rides
Hypercoasters
Warner Bros. Movie World
DC Comics in amusement parks
Roller coasters in Australia
Roller coasters operated by Village Roadshow Theme Parks
Warner Bros. Global Brands and Experiences attractions
2017 establishments in Australia